The 2015 season is SCG Muangthong United's seventh season in the Thai Premier League of SCG Muangthong United Football Club. Since 2009 to present.

Pre-season and friendlies

Thai Premier League

Thai FA Cup
Chang FA Cup

Thai League Cup
Toyota League Cup

Squad statistics

Transfers
First Thai footballer's market is opening on 6 November 2014 to 28 January 2015

Second Thai footballer's market is opening on 3 June 2015 to 30 June 2015

In

Out

Loan out

Mua
Muangthong United F.C. seasons